The Coșuștea is a right tributary of the river Motru in Romania. It discharges into the Motru near Stejaru.

References

Rivers of Romania
Rivers of Mehedinți County